Arnold Vaide (17 April 1926 – 5 June 2011) was an Estonian-born Swedish athlete and football coach. He was involved with various sections of the Halmstad sports club for 40 years.

Athletics career
Arnold Vaide was born and raised in Salla, Estonia. His brother Karl Vaide was an accomplished orienteer, skiing and shooting referee and trainer. While a student, he began training as a skier under instruction of Elmar Liiv. In 1944, following the second Soviet occupation of Estonia during World War II, Vaide fled to Sweden as a refugee while his brother Karl remained in Estonia and became an Estonian veteran orienteering champion.   

He competed for Sweden in the marathon at the 1956 and 1960 Olympics and placed 11th and 21st, respectively. He also won the Swedish national titles in 1958 and 1960.

Football career

In 1963 he served as a coach of football club Halmstad, alongside Rune Ludvigsson. He was in charge of the player's fitness, while Ludvigsson was in charge of the match tactics.

References

1926 births
2011 deaths
People from Väike-Maarja Parish
Swedish football managers
Halmstads BK managers
Swedish male long-distance runners
Swedish male marathon runners
Estonian football managers
Estonian male long-distance runners
Estonian male marathon runners
Athletes (track and field) at the 1956 Summer Olympics
Athletes (track and field) at the 1960 Summer Olympics
Olympic athletes of Sweden
Estonian emigrants to Sweden
Estonian World War II refugees